Hashtadan (also Romanized as Hashtādān; also known as Hashtādom and Hashtādūn) is a village in Jowshan Rural District, Golbaf District, Kerman County, Kerman Province, Iran. At the 2006 census, its population was 242, in 58 families.

References 

Populated places in Kerman County